Ellert and Brammert are legendary giants from Dutch folklore who supposedly robbed travellers in Drenthe, Netherlands.

The Ellert en Brammert museum is named after them.

References

Dutch folklore
Literary duos
Giants